Spring Hill is a city in Johnson and Miami counties in the U.S. state of Kansas, and part of the Kansas City Metropolitan Area.  As of the 2020 census, the population of the city was 7,952.

History
In 1856, James B. Hovey named the community after a town near Mobile, Alabama. "Being somewhat enthusiastic in my estimation of its future, it having all advantages of timber and water, and on a line that must be traveled between Olathe and Paola, I concluded to myself, as there was no one else to conclude with, that this was a good place for a town." – J.B. Hovey, 1857   Hovey served as the communities first postmaster.  Also that year, Hovey built the first building in town, the Spring Hill Hotel.  The two-story structure, also known as the "Old Traveler's Rest" was located on the highest elevation in town.

In January 1859 Celia Ann Dayton, a doctor in Vermont, became the first woman doctor in the state of Kansas by moving to Spring Hill.  She arrived with her adopted son Hiram Eugene, also a doctor, and her husband Amos arrived a few months later. Hiram was killed in January 1862 during the American Civil War after being discovered as a spy for the Union.  Also in 1862, Celia divorced her husband, which was very uncommon for the time period.  Celia frequently aided black refugees, and is reported to have been part of the underground railroad.
In the fall of 1862, Spring Hill avoided Quantrill's Raiders entering the town when a farmer talked to them on their way.  He calmly convinced them there were soldiers in town, when there were not.  This deterred them from continuing. However, a year later in 1863, the Quantrill Raiders did march on Spring Hill, looting businesses in town and stealing from local farmers. At least one citizen was killed.

By the 1870s, Spring Hill was growing in population and commerce.  However, a railroad to come right through the town wanted to bypass Spring Hill unless it paid $15,000 to grade the land there. The residents didn't want to share the costs, and the tracks were moved to approximately a half-mile east of the original town square. The town's businesses then quickly moved to be closer to the train depot and tracks.
In 1874, the country's economic depression hit Spring Hill. Also that year, swarms of grasshoppers devoured plant life, then moved on to items such as clothes, blankets and shoes. Even leather harnesses, pitch fork handles, and fence posts were not immune to them.  As a result, water sources were polluted, and gardens and crops were devastated.  Livestock were nearly inedible.   

In the 1920s the Spring Hill Rural High School District was established, and in 1926, the original city jail was constructed by A. H. Starbuck.  By the 1950s most of the rural area surrounding Spring Hill also had electricity.  In the 1960s Spring Hill's elementary and high school merged due to a state law requiring public schooling for kindergarten through the 12th grade. Spring Hill's growth had nearly stopped by the 1980s until community leaders decided to focus on attracting industry to develop there.  This strategy drew new residents, followed by increased retail and service businesses.

On May 20, 1957 around 7:00 p.m., an F5 tornado, known as the Ruskin Heights tornado, struck Spring Hill and surrounding towns.  Elston Steel Factory along with 21 homes and 18 barns were destroyed in the storm, with most damage occurring between Allen and King Street, north of Jackson Street.  The cemetery also received a lot of damage to the trees and gravestones.  The only fatalities in Spring Hill was the Davis Family, including Isam Davis, his wife Barbara, and their daughters Tamara and Pamela (ages five and six).  A neighbor reported they were killed trying to leave their home and make it to their station wagon to escape the storm.  Their home was completely destroyed by the tornado and their bodies were found close to 207th Street and US 169 Highway (present day Webster Street).  Davis Street in Spring Hill is named after the family.

Incorporated in 1857, Spring Hill celebrated its sesquicentennial in 2007, honoring its history.  Today, many community events occur annually, and include The King of the Hill Barbeque, the Spring Hill Fall Festival, and Hometown Holidays.

Geography

Demographics

2010 census
As of the census of 2010, there were 5,437 people, 1,919 households, and 1,447 families residing in the city. The racial makeup of the city was 93.7% White, 1.6% African American, 0.6% Native American, 0.7% Asian, 0.9% from other races, and 2.5% from two or more races. Hispanic or Latino of any race were 4.0% of the population.

There were 1,919 households, of which 46.3% had children under the age of 18 living with them, 60.7% were married couples living together, 10.0% had a female householder with no husband present, 4.7% had a male householder with no wife present, and 24.6% were non-families. 20.5% of all households were made up of individuals, and 8% had someone living alone who was 65 years of age or older. The average household size was 2.81 and the average family size was 3.26.

The median age in the city was 32.3 years. 32.2% of residents were under the age of 18; 5.5% were between the ages of 18 and 24; 34% were from 25 to 44; 19.6% were from 45 to 64; and 8.6% were 65 years of age or older. The gender makeup of the city was 49.9% male and 50.1% female.

2000 census
As of the census of 2000, there were 2,727 people, 973 households, and 747 families residing in the city. The racial makeup of the city was 96.48% White, 0.81% African American, 0.84% Native American, 0.15% Asian, 0.04% Pacific Islander, 0.51% from other races, and 1.17% from two or more races. Hispanic or Latino of any race were 2.79% of the population.

There were 973 households, out of which 44.8% had children under the age of 18 living with them, 59.7% were married couples living together, 13.4% had a female householder with no husband present, and 23.2% were non-families. 19.6% of all households were made up of individuals, and 7.3% had someone living alone who was 65 years of age or older. The average household size was 2.76 and the average family size was 3.17.

In the city, the population was spread out, with 31.9% under the age of 18, 8.1% from 18 to 24, 34.5% from 25 to 44, 17.0% from 45 to 64, and 8.4% who were 65 years of age or older. The median age was 31 years. For every 100 females, there were 98.8 males. For every 100 females age 18 and over, there were 93.3 males.

The median income for a household in the city was $45,052, and the median income for a family was $54,375. Males had a median income of $36,250 versus $24,713 for females. The per capita income for the city was $19,642. About 3.5% of families and 4.7% of the population were below the poverty line, including 5.4% of those under age 18 and 7.0% of those age 65 or over.

Arts and culture
Today, many community events occur annually in Spring Hill, and include The King of the Hill Barbeque, the Spring Hill Fall Festival, and Hometown Holidays. Also located in Spring Hill is a golf course, Sycamore Ridge, where several of Spring Hill's community organizations and businesses hold golf tournaments.

The Johnson County Library includes 13 locations throughout Johnson County, including the Spring Hill Library.

Government
The Spring Hill government consists of a mayor and five council members.

Education
Spring Hill serves as the center of the Spring Hill School District (USD 230), which includes 5 elementary schools, 2 middle schools, and 1 high school.  Schools included in the district are:
 Prairie Creek Elementary School (grades K-5)
 Spring Hill Elementary School (grades K-5)
 Wolf Creek Elementary School (grades K-5)
 Timber Sage Elementary School (grades K-5)
 Dayton Creek Elementary School (grades K-5)
 Spring Hill Middle School (grades 6-8)
 Woodland Spring Middle School (grades 6-8)
 Spring Hill High School (grades 9-12

Notable people

 Curly Brown (1888-1968), baseball pitcher
 Gary Burrell (1937-2019), co-founder and chairman emeritus of Garmin
 Stephen J. Chamberlin (1889-1971), U.S. Army Lieutenant General

See also
 Hillsdale Lake and Hillsdale State Park

References

Further reading

External links
 City of Spring Hill
 Spring Hill - Directory of Public Officials
 USD 230, local school district
 Spring Hill city map, KDOT

Cities in Kansas
Cities in Johnson County, Kansas
Cities in Miami County, Kansas
Populated places established in 1856
Populated places on the Underground Railroad
1856 establishments in Kansas Territory